Natacha Cajuste (born 2 May 1984) is a Haitian footballer who plays as a defender. She has been a member of the Haiti women's national team.

References

1984 births
Living people
Women's association football defenders
Haitian women's footballers
Haiti women's international footballers
Women's Premier Soccer League players
Haitian expatriate footballers
Haitian expatriate sportspeople in the United States
Expatriate women's soccer players in the United States